Judd Green (also credited as R. Judd Green; 1866–1932) was a British film actor of the silent era. He was born in Portsmouth, Hampshire in 1866 and made his first screen appearance in 1914.

Selected filmography
 The Third String (1914)
 Called Back (1914)
 Thelma (1918)
 The Wages of Sin (1918)
 The Life Story of David Lloyd George (1918)
 The Kinsman (1919)
 The Forest on the Hill (1919)
 The Lamp of Destiny (1919)
 A Smart Set (1919)
 When It Was Dark (1919)
 Little Dorrit (1920)
 The Tidal Wave (1920)
 The Amateur Gentleman (1920)
 Class and No Class (1921)
 A Master of Craft (1922)
 The Knight Errant (1922)
 Boden's Boy (1923)
 In the Blood (1923)
 The Stirrup Cup Sensation  (1924)
 The Alley of Golden Hearts (1924)
 Three to One Against (1932)
 The Harbour Lights (1923)
The Gold Cure (1925)
 Trainer and Temptress (1925)
 Nell Gwyn (1926)
 Shooting Stars (1927)
 Sweeney Todd (1928)
 What Money Can Buy (1928)
 Widecombe Fair (1928)
 The Bondman (1929)
 Escape from Dartmoor (1929)

References

External links
 

1866 births
1932 deaths
English male silent film actors
Male actors from Portsmouth
20th-century English male actors